Young Island may refer to:

 Young Island, Southern Ocean
 Young Island (Grenadines)
 Young Island (Nunavut)